The freestyle competition of the 2018 European Aquatics Championships was held on 7 August 2018.

Results
The preliminary round was started at 09:30. The final was held at 14:40.

Green denotes finalists

References

Men's 1 m springboard